Nika Metreveli (born 14 January 1991) is a Georgian-Italian professional basketball player for BC Titebi of the Georgian Superliga.

Professional career
The 2013–14 season, Metreveli started with Sukhumi but on 3 December 2013 he left the club and signed with Italian second division club Roseto Sharks for the rest of the season.

On 25 June 2014 he signed with Azzurro Napoli Basket 2013 of the Serie A2 Basket, second level of Italian basketball. On 9 January 2015 he left the club. In February 2015, he signed with MIA Academy for the rest of the season.

On 18 September 2015 Metreveli signed with Italian club Betaland Capo d'Orlando. On 5 January 2016 he left Capo d'Orlando and signed with Juvecaserta Basket. On 20 January 2017 he parted ways with Juvecaserta. Four days later he signed with Scafati Basket for the rest of the season.

On 24 August 2019 he signed with BC Titebi of the Georgian Superliga.

National team
Nika Metreveli is a member of Georgia national basketball team.

References

External links
 Profile at legabasket.it 
 Profile at fibaeurope.com

1991 births
Living people
Men's basketball players from Georgia (country)
Basket Napoli players
Basket Rimini Crabs players
Centers (basketball)
Dinamo Sassari players
Juvecaserta Basket players
Lega Basket Serie A players
Mens Sana Basket players
Orlandina Basket players
Pallacanestro Mantovana players
Power forwards (basketball)
Roseto Sharks players
Scafati Basket players
Basketball players from Tbilisi